Zhang Shengwen; (active 1163–1189) was a painter from the Kingdom of Dali (present day Yunnan Province) during the 12th century.

Zhang is known for the Kingdom of Dali Buddhist Volume of Paintings (大理國梵像卷). The entire work is 30.4 cm tall by 16.655 meters long.

Notes

References
 Zhongguo gu dai shu hua jian ding zu (中国古代书画鑑定组). 1997. Zhongguo hui hua quan ji (中国绘画全集). Zhongguo mei shu fen lei quan ji. Beijing: Wen wu chu ban she. Volume 4.

Painters from Yunnan
Buddhist artists